"The Generation Gap" is a song by Australian rock group Hoodoo Gurus. It was released in December 1988 and peaked at number 50 on the ARIA Charts.

In June 2000, Dave Faulkner said "... we persuaded Rick Grossman to join, contributing his tremendous bass skills ... Almost immediately we were in the studio recording a single-only release 'The Generation Gap', a song originally recorded by Jeannie C. Riley (of "Harper Valley PTA" fame). I changed a couple of lines to suit myself but the ones about grown-ups getting stoned were from the original.".

Track listing
7" single (RCA Victor – 104977)
 "The Generation Gap" (Charlie Craig, Betty Craig, Jim Hayner) — 3:40
 "Jungle Bells" (Faulkner) — 3:36

Personnel
Credits
 Dave Faulkner — lead vocals, guitar
 Richard Grossman — bass, backing vocals
 Mark Kingsmill — drums
 Brad Shepherd — guitar, backing vocals

Charts

References

1970 singles
1988 singles
Hoodoo Gurus songs
Songs written by Charlie Craig
Jeannie C. Riley songs
1970 songs
RCA Records singles